Sylvain Claude Wiltord (born 10 May 1974) is a French former professional footballer. Mainly a right winger, he also played as a centre-forward, second striker and on the left wing.

Wiltord had a four-season spell at Arsenal, with whom he won two Premier League titles and two FA Cups. He also won the Ligue 1 title at Bordeaux and in each of his three consecutive seasons at Lyon.

With the France national team, Wiltord earned 92 caps and scored 26 goals. He played at the 1996 Olympics, two FIFA World Cups and two UEFA European Championships. Wiltord was part of the teams which won Euro 2000 (for which he scored a last minute equaliser to take the final to extra time) and reached the final of the 2006 World Cup.

Club career

Early career, Rennes and Bordeaux
Wiltord joined Rennes from lower-league side CO Joinville in 1991. At Rennes, he emerged in the 1993–94 season with eight goals in 26 games.

In summer 1996, after Wiltord's excelled for France at the 1996 Summer Olympics Spanish La Liga club Deportivo de La Coruña reached an agreement with Rennes for him to join from 1 July 1997. As part of the agreement a transfer fee of 300 million pesetas (€1.8 million) was paid to Rennes while Wiltord was loaned back to Rennes for the 1996–97 season. In the summer of 1997, at the end of his spell on loan, he returned to Spain only to request a move back to France so as to link up with Bordeaux. For this transfer a fee of 375 million pesetas (€2.25 million) and a 40% sell-on clause were agreed.

He was ever-present in his first term at Bordeaux and went on to score 22 goals in the following 1998–99 season, where he won the golden boot as Bordeaux lifted the Ligue 1 championship.

Arsenal
Wiltord was signed by English club Arsenal, for what was then a club record fee of £13 million in August 2000, weeks after scoring the stoppage-time equaliser in the Euro 2000 Final. This record fee was not surpassed until eight-and-a-half years later when Arsenal paid £15 million for Russian winger Andrey Arshavin. Whilst with the Gunners he was occasionally paired with Thierry Henry up front or otherwise upon the wing. Wiltord made his debut as a substitute against Chelsea on 6 September 2000, and his first goal followed against Coventry City on 16 September 2000. A highlight in his first season was scoring a first half hat-trick in a win against West Ham United. Arsenal reached the 2001 FA Cup Final which Wiltord started. He was substituted for Ray Parlour with Arsenal leading 1–0, however Liverpool ultimately came back and scored two late goals to win 2–1.

In the 2001–02 season Wiltord scored ten goals in the league as Arsenal finished as champions. He scored crucial winning goals along the way against Chelsea and Everton. The highlight of Wiltord's Arsenal career came at the end of that season; scoring the winning goal over Manchester United at Old Trafford, a 1–0 win which clinched the 2001–02 Premier League title as Arsenal achieved The Double on 8 May. Returning to Old Trafford the following season in the FA Cup, Wiltord netted again as Arsenal saw off United 2–0 in a year where they also won the Cup. Wiltord started the 2002 FA Cup Final and played as a substitute in the 2003 final. 

Wiltord went on to form part of Arsenal's 2003–04 "Invincibles" season, though his appearances were less frequent towards the end of the campaign. During the season he made a total of 12 league appearances, which was enough to earn a title winners' medal. Altogether he played 175 times for the Gunners in all competitions, scoring a total of 49 goals.

In June 2008, Wiltord was voted 33rd in a list of 50 of the greatest Arsenal players of all time.

Lyon
When his contract with Arsenal expired in the summer of 2004, Wiltord trained for two weeks with Rennes and rejected a move to newly promoted Premier League team West Bromwich Albion. He was also reportedly keen on a move to Arsenal's rivals Tottenham Hotspur. On 31 August, he signed for Lyon on an initial two-year contract. Moving to Lyon, Wiltord found further success, winning three Ligue 1 titles and reaching the quarter-finals of the UEFA Champions League in successive seasons.

Rennes
Wiltord signed for Rennes in August 2007 on a two-year contract and with an opportunity to join the coaching staff when he finished his professional career.

Marseille
He joined Marseille on 15 January 2009 for the remainder of the Ligue 1 season. On 17 May 2009, he scored Marseille's only goal in a 3–1 loss to Lyon at home. He was released at the end of the 2008–09 season, and was considering a possible move to either America, UAE or perhaps retirement.

Metz
On 30 January 2010, after training with US Créteil, Wiltord signed with FC Metz until the end of the season.

Nantes
On 18 July 2011, Wiltord came back from retirement and signed a contract at Nantes until the end of 2011–12. He announced his immediate retirement on 11 June 2012.

International career
Wiltord made his debut for France in a 2–0 victory over England on 10 February 1999 at Wembley Stadium. For France, Wiltord has been capped 92 times, scoring 26 goals. His most memorable goal for Les Bleus was scored in dramatic fashion in the last seconds of the UEFA Euro 2000 Final against Italy to tie the match 1–1 and bring the game to extra-time. France then won the final from a golden goal scored by David Trezeguet.

Wiltord remained in the national squad for the 2002 World Cup, where France endured a shocking first round exit without a single win or scoring a single goal, the worst ever performance by a defending champion at the World Cup.

Wiltord also took part at UEFA Euro 2004 in Portugal, having played seven games in the qualifying campaign with a fantastic return of six goals. However, a poor performance from Les Bleus saw a shocking quarter-final exit at the hands of eventual surprise winners Greece.

Wiltord also was a part of Raymond Domenech's France squad that played in the 2006 World Cup final against arch-rivals Italy. Wiltord scored France's first penalty in the ensuing penalty shootout following the 1–1 draw, but France lost the shootout 5–3.

Wiltord is France's 12th highest scorer with 26 goals netted for Les Bleus.

Personal life
Wiltord's parents moved from Martinique to metropolitan France before his birth.

Born in Neuilly-sur-Marne, a commune in the eastern suburbs of Paris, to a mother from the West Indies and a father he did not know. he was one of eight children. At the age of 14, he went to live at his 27-year-old sister's apartment where he cared for his 2-year-old niece.

In 2015, he competed on the TF1 reality show Dropped, in which sportspeople were dropped by helicopter into inhospitable environments. The day after his elimination from the programme, there was a mid-air helicopter collision which killed ten, including three contestants: swimmer Camille Muffat, boxer Alexis Vastine, and sailor Florence Arthaud. He wrote on Twitter after the crash, "I'm sad for my friends, I'm trembling, I'm horrified, I have no words, I don't want to say anything."

Media
Wiltord was sponsored by sportswear company Nike and appeared in Nike commercials. In a global Nike advertising campaign in the run-up to the 2002 World Cup in Korea and Japan, he starred in a "Secret Tournament" commercial (branded "Scopion KO") directed by Terry Gilliam, appearing alongside football players such as Thierry Henry, Ronaldo, Edgar Davids, Fabio Cannavaro, Francesco Totti, Ronaldinho, Luís Figo and Hidetoshi Nakata, with former player Eric Cantona the tournament "referee".

Career statistics

Club

International
Scores and results list France's goal tally first, score column indicates score after each Wiltord goal.

Honours
Bordeaux
Division 1: 1998–99

Arsenal
Premier League: 2001–02, 2003–04
FA Cup: 2001–02, 2002–03
FA Community Shield: 2002

Lyon
Ligue 1: 2004–05, 2005–06, 2006–07

France
UEFA European Championship: 2000
FIFA Confederations Cup: 2001, 2003
FIFA World Cup runner-up: 2006

Individual
French Footballer of the Year: 1999
Premier League Player of the Month: August 2002
UNFP Ligue 1 Team of the Year: 2004–05, 2005–06

References

External links

 Sylvain Wiltord's profile, stats & pics
 Photos & stats at sporting-heroes.net
 
 
 survived a crash dropped at segundoenfoque.com.ar

1974 births
Living people
French people of Martiniquais descent
People from Neuilly-sur-Marne
Footballers from Seine-Saint-Denis
Black French sportspeople
French footballers
Association football midfielders
Stade Rennais F.C. players
Deportivo de La Coruña players
FC Girondins de Bordeaux players
Arsenal F.C. players
Olympique Lyonnais players
Olympique de Marseille players
FC Metz players
FC Nantes players
Ligue 2 players
Ligue 1 players
Premier League players
France under-21 international footballers
Olympic footballers of France
France international footballers
Footballers at the 1996 Summer Olympics
UEFA Euro 2000 players
2001 FIFA Confederations Cup players
2002 FIFA World Cup players
2003 FIFA Confederations Cup players
UEFA Euro 2004 players
2006 FIFA World Cup players
UEFA European Championship-winning players
FIFA Confederations Cup-winning players
French expatriate footballers
French expatriate sportspeople in Spain
French expatriate sportspeople in England
Expatriate footballers in Spain
Expatriate footballers in England
FA Cup Final players